

Major bridges 

See also 

 Transport in Colombia
 Highways in Colombia
 Rail transport in Colombia
 Geography of Colombia
 List of rivers of Colombia
 :es:Anexo:Carreteras nacionales de Colombia  - Annex: National highways of Colombia

References 
 Notes

 Nicolas Janberg, Structurae.com, International Database for Civil and Structural Engineering

 Others references

Further reading

External links 

 
 
 

Colombia

Bridges
b